Scrobipalpa nana is a moth in the family Gelechiidae. It was described by Povolný in 1973. It is found in Turkey, northern Iran, Kazakhstan and the southern Ural Mountains.

The forewings are dirty ashy-white, wit well defined scales and groups of scales with dark to blackish tips. The hindwings are light ashy-grey to dirty whitish.

Subspecies
Scrobipalpa nana nana
Scrobipalpa nana caroxyli (Falkovitsh & Bidzilya, 2006) (Kazakhstan)

References

Scrobipalpa
Moths described in 1973